Golfech is a commune in the Tarn-et-Garonne department in the Occitanie region in southern France.

It neighbours the larger town of Valence d'Agen and stands on the D813 road between Bordeaux and Toulouse and beside the canal de Garonne and railway that also link the cities. The D813 is classified as a departmental road in the French system. 
Formerly, this road was designated as the N113, where the N indicated that it was a national road.
The Voie Verte cycle path serves the commune from Moissac to the east and the western border of Lot-et-Garonne towards Bordeaux. It will eventually run all the way from Bordeaux to Sète. The residents of Golfech are known as Golféchois.

The Golfech Nuclear Power Plant is located in the western part of the commune.

The river Barguelonne forms most of the commune's northern and north-western borders, then flows into the Garonne, which forms all of its south-western border.

Demography

See also
 Communes of the Tarn-et-Garonne department

References

Communes of Tarn-et-Garonne